Damastes of Sigeum was a Greek geographer and historian in the 5th century BC from Sigeum. 

He was probably a pupil of Hellanicus of Lesbos. With the exception of a few fragments, his works do not survive.

Suda wrote that he had many works including the:
Events in Greece
On the Children and Ancestors of those who took part in the Expedition to Troy (also ascribed by some sources to Polus of Acragas)
Gazetteer of Peoples and Cities
On Poets and Sophists

He is mentioned in Dionysius of Halicarnassus work Roman Antiquities.

References

Early Greek historians
5th-century BC historians
5th-century BC Greek people
Ancient Greek geographers
Ancient Greek travel writers